Rasoul Azadani (born 1965) is an Iranian animator, lighting designer and layout artist. He is best known for his work at Walt Disney Animation Studios.
In 1995, he was nominated for an Annie Award in the category "Best Individual Achievement for Production Design in the Field of Animation" for his work on Pocahontas.

Life and career 

Azadani was born in 1965 in the city of Isfahan. He entered Institute for the Intellectual Development of Children and Young Adults to study animation, after receiving his High school diploma. Azadani later worked for the Institution as an Animation Instructor, before emigrating to United States and studying at the California Institute of the Arts. Azadani joined Walt Disney Animation Studios to work as a layout assistant in 1985.

The character Razoul from the Disney animated film Aladdin is named after Azadani. In the movie, Jafar originally used the phrase "Rasoul Azadani" to open the Cave of Wonders, but it was later cut.

Filmography

Awards

References

External links 

1965 births
Living people
Iranian animators
Walt Disney Animation Studios people
Film people from Isfahan
Iranian emigrants to the United States
California Institute of the Arts alumni